Ali Bahjat Fadhil (born 3 March 1992) is an Iraqi footballer who plays as a defender for Al-Naft in the Iraqi Premier League.

International career
On 11 September 2012 Bahjat made his debut against Japan in Saitama Stadium 2002, Saitama, Japan in the 2014 FIFA World Cup qualification, which it was ended 0–1 loss.

Honors

Club
Al-Quwa Al-Jawiya
 Iraqi Premier League: 2016–17, 2020–21
 Iraq FA Cup: 2020–21
 AFC Cup: 2016, 2017, 2018

International
Iraq U-23
 AFC U-22 Championship: 2013
Iraq National football team
 Arab Nations Cup Bronze medallist: 2012
 WAFF Championship runner-up: 2012
 Arabian Gulf Cup runner-up: 2013
 AFC Asian Cup fourth-place: 2015

References 

1992 births
Living people
Iraqi footballers
Iraq international footballers
Association football defenders
Duhok SC players
Al-Mina'a SC players
Footballers at the 2014 Asian Games
2015 AFC Asian Cup players
Sportspeople from Baghdad
Asian Games medalists in football
Al-Shorta SC players
Asian Games bronze medalists for Iraq
Medalists at the 2014 Asian Games
AFC Cup winning players